Milton Bradley (November 8, 1836 – May 30, 1911) was an American business magnate, game pioneer and publisher, credited by many with launching the board game industry, with his eponymous enterprise, which was purchased by Hasbro in 1984, and folded in 1998.

Biography
Born in Vienna, Maine, in 1836, to Lewis and Fannie (Lyford) Bradley, Bradley grew up in a working class household. The family moved to Lowell, Massachusetts, in 1847. After completing high school in 1854, he found work as a draftsman and patent agent before enrolling at the Lawrence Scientific School in Cambridge, Massachusetts. He was unable to finish his studies after moving with his family to Hartford, Connecticut, where he could not find gainful employment. In 1856, Bradley moved to Springfield, Massachusetts, where he worked as a mechanical draftsman.

In 1859, Bradley went to Providence, Rhode Island, to learn lithography; and, in 1860, he set up the first color lithography shop in Springfield, Massachusetts. He moved forward with an idea he had for a board game which he called The Checkered Game of Life, an early version of what later became The Game of Life.

The Milton Bradley Company

Bradley's ventures into the production of board games began with a large failure in his lithograph business. When he printed and sold an image of the little-known Republican presidential nominee Abraham Lincoln, Bradley initially met with great success. But a customer demanded his money back because the picture was not an accurate representation—Lincoln had decided to grow his distinctive beard after Bradley's print was published. Suddenly, the prints were worthless, and Bradley burned those remaining in his possession. Looking for a lucrative alternate project, Bradley found inspiration from an imported board game a friend gave him, concluding that he could produce and market a similar game to American consumers. In the winter of 1860, Bradley released The Checkered Game of Life.

The game proved an instant success. Bradley personally sold his first run of several hundred copies in a two-day visit to New York; by 1861, consumers had bought more than 45,000 copies. The Checkered Game of Life followed a structure similar to its American and British predecessors, with players spinning a teetotum to advance to squares representing social virtues and vices, such as "influence" or "poverty", with the former earning a player points and the latter slowing their progress. But even the most seemingly secure positions, like "Fat Office", held dangers – "Prison", "Ruin", and "Suicide". The first player to accumulate 100 points won the game.

While the structure of play in The Checkered Game of Life differed little from previous board games, Bradley's game embraced a radically different concept of success. Earlier games, such as the popular Mansion of Happiness created in Puritan Massachusetts, focused entirely on promoting moral virtue. Bradley defined success in secular business terms, depicting life as a quest for accomplishment with personal virtues as a means to that end. This complemented America's burgeoning fascination with obtaining wealth, and with "the causal relationship between character and wealth," in the years following the Civil War. The game—and later board games produced by the Milton Bradley Company—also fit the nation's increasing amount of leisure time, leading to great financial success for the company.

From 1860 through the 20th century, the company he founded, Milton Bradley Company, dominated the production of American games, including The Game of Life, Easy Money, Candy Land, Operation, and Battleship. The company was a subsidiary of Pawtucket, Rhode Island–based firm Hasbro from acquisition in 1984 to shutdown in 1998. MB merged with Parker Brothers in 1998 to form Hasbro Games. The two became brands of Hasbro until 2009 when they were retired in favor of the parent company's name and the Milton Bradley name was retired after 149 years.

Late career
Bradley published tracts and pamphlets on Friedrich Fröbel's kindergarten system. His company produced two magazines, Kindergarten News (later Kindergarten Review), and Work and Play. Neither was profitable, and Bradley's business partners withdrew their support, but Bradley persevered, publishing both magazines until the end of his life. His friend George Tapley bought out the partner's shares so that Bradley could continue manufacturing educational materials.

By the 1890s, the Milton Bradley Company had introduced the first standardized watercolor sets, and educational games such as Bradley's Word Builder and Bradley's Sentence Builder. Bradley was also the first to release crayon packages with standardized colors, a forerunner of the Binney & Smith company's Crayola crayons and Artista art supplies. Bradley's interest in art education also led him to produce a new color wheel and publish four books about teaching colors.

Personal life
In 1860, Bradley married Vilona Eaton. They had no children. She died in 1867. In 1869, he married his second wife, Nellie Thayer.  Bradley and Ellen had two daughters.

Milton Bradley died on May 30, 1911, in Springfield, Massachusetts, at age 74. He was buried in Springfield Cemetery in a family plot alongside his father Lewis (1810–1890), his mother Fanny (1813–1872), and his first wife Vilona. His second wife Nellie was buried there after her death in 1918.

In 2004, he was posthumously inducted into the Toy Industry Hall of Fame along with George Ditomassi of Milton Bradley Company.

In 2006, Bradley was posthumously inducted into the National Inventors Hall of Fame.

Books and patents

Books
 Color in the Schoolroom, 1890
 Color in the Kindergarten, 1893
 Elementary Color, 1895
  Water Colors in the Schoolroom, 1900
 Bradley published a set of rules to play croquet in 1866 written by an author using the pseudonym Prof. A Rover.

Patents and inventions

 Invented the Myriopticon panorama viewer depicting scenes in the American Civil War.

References in contemporary culture
The story of Milton Bradley and The Checkered Game of Life is featured as one of the segments in Season 3, Episode 6 of Comedy Central's show Drunk History.

References

External links
 Milton Bradley: A Playful Legacy – slideshow by Life magazine
 
 
 
 

1836 births
1911 deaths
Harvard School of Engineering and Applied Sciences alumni
19th-century American inventors
American game designers
People from Vienna, Maine
Artists from Springfield, Massachusetts
Businesspeople from Maine
Businesspeople from Springfield, Massachusetts
Board game designers
People from Lowell, Massachusetts
19th-century American businesspeople